

Belgium
 Belgian Congo
 Martin Rutten, Governor-General of the Belgian Congo (1923–1927)
 Auguste Tilkens, Governor-General of the Belgian Congo (1927–1934)

France
 French Somaliland – Pierre Aimable Chapon-Baissac, Governor of French Somaliland (1924–1932)
 Guinea –
 Jean Louis Georges Poiret, Lieutenant-Governor of Guinea (1925–1927)
 Antoine Paladi, Lieutenant-Governor of Guinea (1927–1928)

Japan
 Karafuto –
Katsuzō Toyota, Governor-General of Karafuto (5 August 1926 – 27 July 1927)
Kōji Kita, Governor-General of Karafuto (27 July 1927 – 9 July 1929)
 Korea –
Saitō Makoto, Governor-General of Korea (1919–1927)
Kazushige Ugaki, Governor-General of Korea (1927)
Yamanashi Hanzō, Governor-General of Korea (1927–1929)
 Taiwan – Mitsunoshin Kamiyama, Governor-General of Taiwan (16 July 1926 – June 1928)

Portugal
 Angola – António Vicente Ferreira, High Commissioner of Angola (1926–1928)

United Kingdom
 Malta Colony
Walter Congreve, Governor of Malta (1924–1927)
John Philip Du Cane, Governor of Malta (1927–1931)
 Northern Rhodesia
 Sir Herbert Stanley, Governor of Northern Rhodesia (1924–1927)
 Richard Goode, acting Governor of Northern Rhodesia (1927)
 Sir James Maxwell, Governor of Northern Rhodesia (1927–1932)

Notes

Colonial governors
Colonial governors
1927